The Ceremony of the Keys is held in Holyrood Palace, Edinburgh, at the start of the British monarch's week-long residence there in July. Soon after the monarch's arrival, in the forecourt of the Palace, the Queen or King is symbolically offered the keys to the city of Edinburgh by the Lord Provost:

The monarch returns the keys, saying:

A Ceremony of the Keys is also held at the start of the General Assembly of the Church of Scotland when the Lord High Commissioner, as the Monarch's representative, receives the keys from the Lord Provost.

References

External links
 The Queen in Edinburgh for the Ceremony of the Keys (2017)

Tourist attractions in Edinburgh
Culture in Edinburgh
State ritual and ceremonies
Annual events in the United Kingdom
Ceremonies in the United Kingdom